Springbank is a rural community in southern Alberta in Rocky View County. It is located immediately west of the City of Calgary, east of Highway 22, south of the Bow River and north of the rural community of Elbow Valley. Both the Trans-Canada Highway and Lower Springbank Road (north of Highway 8) connect Springbank to Calgary.

Springbank consists mostly of country residential acreages developed with estate homes and features the Springbank Airport. The adjacent rural communities of Bearspaw to the north, across the Bow River, and Elbow Valley to the south, across the Elbow River, also consist mostly of country residential acreages. The urban community of Harmony is adjacent to the Springbank Airport to the west.

Eastern portions of Springbank have been annexed by Calgary since the early 1980s. These portions are now developed with the Calgary neighbourhoods of Springbank Hill, Aspen Woods, West Springs, Cougar Ridge, Crestmont and Valley Ridge.

Springbank is named after Springbank Creek which flows southeast into the Elbow River. The descriptive name for this creek was first applied to the municipal district in 1918 (MD of Springbank). It was first given as a school district name on July 11, 1887 because of the numerous springs breaking out of the sides of the lesser coulees all over the district. Most of the early settlers located near the springs.

Attractions 
Calaway Park, an outdoor family amusement park, is located in Springbank.

Golf courses in Springbank include the Pinebrook Golf Club, Glencoe Golf and Country Club, Springbank Links Golf Course and Elbow Springs Golf Course.

Transportation 
The Springbank Airport is located within Springbank. It was the 12th busiest airport in Canada in 2011 in terms of total aircraft movements.

Climate

Education 
Schools located in Springbank, operated by Rocky View Schools, include:
Elbow Valley Elementary School (kindergarten to grade 4);
Springbank Middle School (grades 5 to 8); and
Springbank Community High School (grades 9 to 12).

The high school is located within the Springbank Park For All Seasons, which also includes an ice arena and a curling rink.

Private schools in the area are Webber Academy, Rundle College, and Edge School for Athletes.

Shopping 
Springbank has a business park and shopping area located along the Trans-Canada Highway south of Highway 1 between Range Roads 32 and 35. The area has a few businesses including a bottle recycling depot, a seasonal farmers market, pet hospital, truck/RV repair shop and some commercial offices.

Notable residents 

Jann Arden, musician
Lanny McDonald, former professional hockey player
Darryl Sutter, head coach of the Calgary Flames
Roman Turek, former professional hockey player

References 

Karamitsanis, Aphrodite (1992). Place Names of Alberta – Volume II, Southern Alberta, University of Calgary Press, Calgary, Alberta.
Read, Tracey (1983). Acres and Empires – A History of the Municipal District of Rocky View, Calgary, Alberta.

External links 
 
Springbank community website

Rocky View County
Calgary Region